Two flats may refer to:

B-flat major, a major musical key with two flats
G minor, a minor musical key with two flats
Symphony in Two Flats, a 1930 British drama
Duplex (building), a house plan with two living units ("flats")